Neoleptoneta is a genus of North American leptonetids that was first described by Paolo Marcello Brignoli in 1972.

Species
 it contains eight species, all found in Mexico:
Neoleptoneta bonita (Gertsch, 1974) – Mexico
Neoleptoneta brunnea (Gertsch, 1974) – Mexico
Neoleptoneta caliginosa Brignoli, 1977 – Mexico
Neoleptoneta capilla (Gertsch, 1971) (type) – Mexico
Neoleptoneta delicata (Gertsch, 1971) – Mexico
Neoleptoneta limpida (Gertsch, 1974) – Mexico
Neoleptoneta rainesi (Gertsch, 1971) – Mexico
Neoleptoneta reclusa (Gertsch, 1971) – Mexico

See also
 List of Leptonetidae species

References

Araneomorphae genera
Leptonetidae
Spiders of Mexico
Spiders of the United States
Taxa named by Paolo Brignoli